Sackville George Stopford-Sackville DL, JP (19 March 1840 – 6 October 1926), known as Sackville Stopford until 1870, was a British Conservative politician.

Background and education
Born Sackville Stopford, Stopford-Sackville was the eldest son of William Stopford-Sackville, son of Reverend the Hon. Richard Bruce Stopford, younger son of James Stopford, 2nd Earl of Courtown. His mother was Caroline Harriett, daughter and heiress of the Hon. George Sackville, younger son of George Germain, 1st Viscount Sackville. He assumed in 1870 (alongside his father) by Royal licence the additional surname of Sackville. Through his mother he notably inherited Drayton House, Lowick, Northamptonshire. He was educated at Christ Church, Oxford.

Political career
Stopford-Sackville was returned to Parliament for Northamptonshire North in 1867, a seat he held until 1880. He remained out of the House of Commons for the next twenty years trying unsuccessfully to return to parliament in the 1894 Wisbech by-election.  In 1900 he was re-elected for his previous constituency Northamptonshire North, and continued to represent it until 1906. He was also an Alderman of the Northamptonshire County Council and served as a Deputy Lieutenant and Justice of the Peace of that county.

Family
Stopford-Sackville married Edith Frances, daughter of William Rashleigh, in 1875. There were no children from the marriage. She died in December 1905. Sackville-Stopford survived her by over twenty years and died in October 1926, aged 86.

A reredos was installed in his memory in St Peter's Church, Lowick.

See also
Earl of Courtown
Viscount Sackville

References

External links 
 

1840 births
1926 deaths
Conservative Party (UK) MPs for English constituencies
UK MPs 1865–1868
UK MPs 1868–1874
UK MPs 1874–1880
UK MPs 1900–1906
Alumni of Christ Church, Oxford
Members of Northamptonshire County Council
English justices of the peace
Deputy Lieutenants of Northamptonshire